Kamonegi is a Japanese restaurant in Seattle's Fremont neighborhood, in the U.S. state of Washington.

The menu includes soba bowls and tempura. Kamonegi was the Seattle Metropolitan 2018 Restaurant of the Year. Jessica Voelker and Stefan Milne included the business in Conde Nast Traveler 2021 list of Seattle's 21 best restaurants. Naomi Tomky included the restaurant in Thrillist's 2022 overview of "where to eat in Seattle right now". Aimee Rizzo included Spinasse in The Infatuation's 2023 overview of Seattle's 25 best restaurants.

See also 

 List of Japanese restaurants

References

External links
 

Fremont, Seattle
Japanese restaurants in Seattle